Anolis alutaceus, the blue-eyed grass-bush anole, Monte Verde anole, or blue-eyed twig anole, is a species of lizard in the family Dactyloidae. The species is found on Isla de la Juventud in Cuba.

References

Anoles
Reptiles of Cuba
Endemic fauna of Cuba
Reptiles described in 1861
Taxa named by Edward Drinker Cope